The 1982 Delaware Fightin' Blue Hens football team was an American football team that represented the University of Delaware as an independent during the 1982 NCAA Division I-AA football season. Delaware ended the regular season ranked No. 3 in the nation, and made it to the Division I-AA national championship game, where the Hens lost by 3 points.

In their 17th year under head coach Tubby Raymond, the Hens compiled a 12–2 record (10–1 regular season). Paul Brown was the team captain.

The Hens suffered their only regular-season loss, to Division I-A Temple, in their second week of play, just before the first week of weekly rankings. As their 11-game win streak developed, however, they rapidly climbed the national Top 20, reaching as high as No. 2 and settling as the No. 3 team. Delaware had a first-round playoff bye and won two playoff games before losing the Pioneer Bowl national championship game.

Delaware played its home games at Delaware Stadium on the university campus in Newark, Delaware.

Schedule

References

Delaware
Delaware Fightin' Blue Hens football seasons
Delaware Fightin' Blue Hens football